Live Oak High School may refer to:
Live Oak High School (Morgan Hill, California), a public school
Live Oak High School (Antioch, California), a public school
Live Oak High School (Live Oak, California), a public school
Live Oak High School (Louisiana), a public school